Ron Black may refer to:

 Ronald Black (born 1935), member of the Pennsylvania House of Representatives
 Ron Black (footballer) (1908–1983), Australian rules footballer